Tolidomordella discoidea is a species of beetle  in the genus Tolidomordella of the family Mordellidae. It was described in 1845.

Subspecies
Tolidomordella discoidea discoidea (Melsheimer, 1845)
Tolidomordella discoidea flaviventris (Smith, 1883)

References

Mordellidae
Beetles described in 1845